Melania Felicitas Costa Schmid, (born 24 April 1989), also known as Melani Costa, is a Spanish competition swimmer.

She competed in the 2008 Summer Olympics in the 200 m and the  freestyle.  At the 2012 Summer Olympics in the women's 400 metre freestyle, finishing 9th in the heats, failing to qualify for the final.  She also competed in the women's 200 metre freestyle, finishing 9th in semifinal, failing to qualify for the final.  She also competed in the  freestyle, finishing in 10th, and the  medley relay, finishing in 13th.  At the 2016 Olympics, she again competed in the 200 m and 400 m freestyle, finishing in 19th and 17th respectively.  She also competed in the  freestyle and  freestyle, finishing in 13th and 16th.

She won six medals in FINA World Swimming Championships (25 m), including a gold medal. She is also silver medalist in the FINA World Aquatics Championships.

References

External links
Profile at FINA

1989 births
Living people
Spanish people of German descent
Sportspeople from Palma de Mallorca
Spanish female freestyle swimmers
Florida Gators women's swimmers
Olympic swimmers of Spain
Swimmers at the 2008 Summer Olympics
Swimmers at the 2012 Summer Olympics
Swimmers at the 2016 Summer Olympics
Medalists at the FINA World Swimming Championships (25 m)
World Aquatics Championships medalists in swimming
Universiade medalists in swimming
Swimmers at the 2018 Mediterranean Games
Mediterranean Games silver medalists for Spain
Mediterranean Games bronze medalists for Spain
Mediterranean Games medalists in swimming
Universiade gold medalists for Spain
Universiade silver medalists for Spain
Universiade bronze medalists for Spain
Medalists at the 2011 Summer Universiade